Davis Gym is an indoor athletics facility on the campus of Bucknell University in Lewisburg, Pennsylvania. It is currently home to Bucknell Bison volleyball and wrestling. It was the primary venue for basketball and other indoor sports until the Sojka Pavilion opened in 2003. It hosted the Patriot League men's basketball tournament title game in 1993. Following renovations in the 1990s to add reserved seats, Davis Gym's listed capacity was 2,500, though on occasion standing room crowds exceeded that.

Davis Gym is named for John Warren Davis, class of 1896 and chairman of the board of trustees at the time of its opening.  It was dedicated in his honor in 1938. The gym replaced Tustin Gymnasium (now Tustin Hall), built in 1890. The building, located on the northern edge of campus with the Lewisburg Cemetery behind it, has a barrel vault ceiling, with end zone scoreboards and seating above the sides of the court. Formerly, bleachers were located courtside during its time as a basketball gym, and a stage was located at the rear (northwest) end of the building but has since been blocked off.

References

College basketball venues in the United States
Sports venues in Pennsylvania
Indoor arenas in Pennsylvania
Basketball venues in Pennsylvania
Defunct college basketball venues in the United States
Wrestling venues in Pennsylvania
Bucknell Bison basketball